Montrose Music Festival is an annual event, taking place at the end of May in Montrose, Angus, Scotland. The festival first took place in 2008 and is organised by volunteers on a non-profit basis. It won the "Pride of Angus Award" in 2008.

The festival takes place over a three-day period. It is run by a group of volunteers as a non-profit organization and a registered charity. The aim is to promote free, live music of all styles and genres. The festival promotes local artists at various venues, and hosts musicians from across the UK.

there have been no events since 2018 and all social media accounts remain inactive. Since the last official event, other musical events have been organised through Facebook groups such as Montrose Live, and Virtual Montrose Music Festival.

History

Inauguration
The first Montrose Music Festival took place Friday 31 May - Sunday 1 June 2008 and was considered a success, bringing thousands of visitors and an estimated £500,000 boost to the local economy. The main attraction was the opening concert by Average White Band, leveraging Montrose's connection with original AWB saxophonist Malcolm Duncan.

On Saturday and Sunday, the music moved into pubs and hotels with over 60 free-entry gigs over the two days. The event included musical acts of varying genres, performing for thousands of attendees. Among these acts were harmonica player Fraser Speirs, Scottish folk band Malinky, English Singer/songwriter Joni Fuller and Oxford-based alt-rock band Lights Action.

2009
The 2009 festival took place from Thursday to Sunday, 28–31 May. Scottish band Deacon Blue headlined. Tickets sold out within 20 minutes. The band then added a second night of playing on the 28th.

2010
2010 saw the team pull in The Fortunate Sons (Now Big Figure) supported by The Worry Beads. Later in the year the Proclaimers came to town .

2011
In 2011, MoFest hosted Skerryvore with support from Dr. Feelgood.

2012
May - Eddi Reader

Ian "H" Watkins played but the festival was abandoned after several missiles were thrown from the crowd after confusion about the line up where fans were expecting welsh rock band Lostprophets

2013

Toploader performed in May, followed in November by Eddi Reader.

2014
The headliner was Status Quo, supported by The Holy Ghosts. In November, Amelia Lily, Stooshe & The Loveable Rogues performed.

2015
In its 8th Year, Mofest brought ASH to the Town Hall, supported by The Amorettes, a 3-piece female rock band from Glasgow, and local group If All Else Fails, all from 22 to 24 May.

Additions included The Market Area, supported by Event Scotland for the promotion of local Scottish food and drink. A structure called The MoDome was set up as a chillout zone and for hosting acoustic sets after the main stage had finished.

2016

Jools Holland headlined in May, followed in August by Bryan Adams.

2017

Pearl Jam headlined with Nirvana, who had The Pogues frontman Shane MacGowan filling the void of Kurt Cobain

2018

The Fishwife of Wishaw performed with The East Kilbride cabbage munchers supporting The Waterboys on the Saturday with Sauchiebaw Street Pilgrims supporting Slipknot on the Sunday.

2019

The legend of Bod of Montrose played a solo set in Busbys when it was Busbys after using his lego Delorean to go back in time. Afterwards he was sick on a police dog while wearing a lovely white dress. The support act Pobsy didn't turn up as he jumped out a second floor window and buckled his ankle, whinging constantly to get a kiddie back to the pub.

References

External links
Montrose Music Festival Photostream

Music festivals in Scotland
Recurring events established in 2008